The  is a railway line operated by West Japan Railway Company (JR West) in Tottori Prefecture, Japan.

Stations
All stations are in Tottori Prefecture. The stations have nicknames corresponding to monsters that appear in GeGeGe no Kitaro.

History
The entire line opened in 1902. The section to Goto was electrified in 1982, and freight services ceased in 1986.

In 2008, Oshinozu Station was closed and the line relocated 800 m east to serve Yonago Airport, with the new station named accordingly.

JR West announced an 800 million yen renovation of the line's rolling stock (22 cars) in October 2017, to be completed by spring 2019. The renovation will introduce on-board fare payment using ICOCA proximity cards (as well as Suica and other major Japanese transit cards). Most stations on the line are unmanned, requiring fares to be paid to the train conductor; the upgrade is intended to increase efficiency, and to better serve travelers from Tokyo, Osaka and other metropolitan areas where proximity cards are commonly used.

See also
 List of railway lines in Japan

References

Rail transport in Tottori Prefecture
Lines of West Japan Railway Company
1067 mm gauge railways in Japan
Airport rail links in Japan